William Leonard Hughes (born January 30, 1895) was an American college football player and coach. He was the head football coach at DePauw University from 1925 to 1929.

References

1895 births
Year of death missing
DePauw Tigers athletic directors 
DePauw Tigers football coaches
Nebraska Wesleyan Prairie Wolves football players
People from Clay County, Nebraska